Leucaltis is a genus of sponges belonging to the family Leucaltidae.

The genus has almost cosmopolitan distribution.

Species:

Leucaltis arabica
Leucaltis clathria 
Leucaltis cucumis
Leucaltis impura
Leucaltis mauritiana 
Leucaltis nodusgordii 
Leucaltis pandora
Leucaltis perimina
Leucaltis pura
Leucaltis solida
Leucaltis tenuis

References

Clathrinida
Sponge genera